Exorbaetta is a Neotropical genus of butterflies in the family Lycaenidae. The genus is monotypic containing the single species Exorbaetta metanira

References

Eumaeini
Lycaenidae of South America
Monotypic butterfly genera
Lycaenidae genera